Fabio Massimo Castaldo  is an Italian politician who has served in the European Parliament since 2014. 

On 15 November 2017 he was elected vice-president of the European Parliament to replace Alexander Graf Lambsdorff, becoming the youngest vice president in the history of the institution.

He was re-elected MEP in the 2019 EP election.

On 3 July 2019 he was re-elected Vice-President of the European Parliament, running as an independent with the support of over 40 MEPs belonging to various political groups, as the European delegation of the Five Star Movement belonged to the technical grouping of the Non-Inscrits. His election represents the second success of an independent following the 2009 election of Edward McMillan-Scott.

References

Living people
Year of birth missing (living people)
Place of birth missing (living people)
MEPs for Italy 2019–2024
Five Star Movement MEPs
Politicians from Rome